Buffalo Boy may refer to:

The Buffalo Boy, a 2004 Vietnamese film directed by Minh Nguyen-Vo
Buffalo Boy, a series of fashion spreads evolved by Ray Petrie and others